Kasehgaran (also Romanized as Kāsehgarān; also known as Kasakeran) is a village in Lahijan Rural District, in the Central District of Piranshahr County, West Azerbaijan Province, Iran. At the 2006 census, its population was 306, in 44 families.

References 

Populated places in Piranshahr County